Oxinas or Oxines was a town on the eastern coast of ancient Bithynia located on the Black Sea, probably near the mouth of the river of the same name.

Its site is tentatively located at Oksina, Asiatic Turkey.

References

Populated places in Bithynia
Former populated places in Turkey
History of Zonguldak Province